The 2007–08 BYU Cougars men's basketball team represented Brigham Young University in the 2007–08 college basketball season. This was head coach Dave Rose's third season at BYU. The Cougars competed in the Mountain West Conference and played their home games at the Marriott Center.

Roster
Source

Rankings

*AP does not release post-NCAA Tournament rankings.

References

BYU Cougars men's basketball seasons
BYU Cougars
BYU Cougars men's bask
BYU Cougars men's bask
BYU